The Virginia Slims of Hawaii is a defunct WTA Tour affiliated women's tennis tournament played in 1973. It was held in Honolulu, Hawaii in the United States and played on outdoor hard courts.

Past finals

Singles

Doubles

Hard court tennis tournaments
Virginia Slims tennis tournaments
Defunct tennis tournaments in the United States
History of women in Hawaii